4-Maleylacetoacetate (4-maleylacetoacetatic acid) is an intermediate in the metabolism of tyrosine. It is converted to fumarylacetoacetate by the enzyme 4-maleylacetoacetate cis-trans-isomerase. Gluthathione coenzymatically helps in conversion to fumarylacetoacetic acid.

See also
 Homogentisate 1,2-dioxygenase

Beta-keto acids
Enones
Diketones